Brodskyella angustata is a beetle in the genus Brodskyella of the family Mordellidae. It was described in 1923 by Píc.

References

Mordellidae
Beetles described in 1923